Archodonata is an extinct order of palaeozoic paleopterous insects, sometimes included in Odonata.

References 

Extinct insect orders
Palaeodictyopteroidea